Arthur Edward Garibaldi (August 21, 1907 – October 19, 1967) was a Major League Baseball third baseman and second baseman who played for the St. Louis Cardinals in . Garibaldi played in the minor leagues from  until . He won the Pacific Coast League MVP Award in 1937.

Garibaldi died of a self-inflicted gunshot wound in 1967.

References

External links

1907 births
1967 suicides
Major League Baseball third basemen
Major League Baseball second basemen
St. Louis Cardinals players
Baseball players from San Francisco
Suicides by firearm in California
Pacific Coast League MVP award winners